Rimi Tomy is an Indian playback singer,Carnatic Musician, television host,and an occasional actress. She started her career by anchoring music programs in television and sang her first song "Chingamasam Vannu Chernnal" in the 2002 film Meesa Madhavan with co-singer Shanker Mahadevan.

She has anchored a number of television shows and has judged many reality shows of different genres. She made her debut as actress in the Aashiq Abu film 5 Sundarikal. She enacted her first lead role opposite Jayaram in the 2015 film Thinkal Muthal Velli Vare.

She has also appeared in the song sequences of films like Balram Vs Tharadas, Kaaryasthan, and 916. She has also acted in many advertisements.

Early life
She was born to Tomy Joseph and Rani Tomy in a Syro-Malabar Catholic family in Pala, Kottayam. She has a sister, Reenu Tomy, and a brother, Rinku Tomy. Her father died on 6 July 2014 due to cardiac arrest.

Career

She started her career as a singer with the well known troupe, Angel Voice. It was during a show with Angel Voice that Mimicry artist, composer and lyricist Nadirshah spotted her and recommended her to Meesa Madhavan film director Lal Jose and film composer Vidyasagar. It was from there that her singing career skyrocketed.

Personal life
She married Royce Kizhakoodan on 27 April 2008 at Lourde Cathedral church, Thrissur. In 2019, the couple filed for a mutual divorce petition after 11 years of marriage. She lives in Edapally, Kochi. Her brother Rinku Tomy is married to actress Muktha.

Discography
Following is a partial discography:

Filmography

Television

Films

Albums

References

External links
 

Malayalam playback singers
Living people
People from Pala, Kerala
Actresses in Malayalam cinema
Actresses in Malayalam television
Indian film actresses
Actresses from Kerala
Indian women television presenters
Indian television presenters
Television personalities from Kerala
Singers from Kerala
20th-century Indian actresses
21st-century Indian actresses
Indian women playback singers
20th-century Indian singers
21st-century Indian singers
20th-century Indian women singers
Film musicians from Kerala
21st-century Indian women singers
Women musicians from Kerala
1983 births